This is a list of newspapers in Maryland.

Daily and weekly newspapers (currently published)

Defunct

See also
 List of newspapers in Maryland in the 18th century
 Ethnic press in Baltimore
 Maryland media
 List of radio stations in Maryland
 List of television stations in Maryland
 Media of locales in Maryland: Baltimore, College Park, Cumberland, Frederick, Gaithersburg
 Journalism:
 :Category:Journalists from Maryland
 University of Maryland Philip Merrill College of Journalism in College Park
 Maryland literature

References

Bibliography
  (+ List of titles 50+ years old)
 
 
 
 
 
 George C. Keidel. The Earliest German Newspapers of Baltimore: An Essay. Washington: Privately printed, 1927
 

External links

 
  (Directory ceased in 2017)
 
  (Includes Maryland newspapers) 
 
 
 
 
 
 
 Original Newspaper collection at the University of Maryland libraries. 

Images